Corynothrix is a genus of slender springtails in the family Entomobryidae. There is at least one described species in Corynothrix, C. borealis.

References

Further reading

 
 
 

Springtail genera